Women Exploited By Abortion (WEBA) is a United States organization founded by Nancy Jo Mann in 1982 that aims to expand the anti-abortion conversation. WEBA does this by focusing on mild to severe emotional, mental, and physical distress and regret women face after having undergone an abortion. Women of WEBA claim that their distress is as a result of the procedure and the lack of information presented to them regarding “post abortion syndrome”  by abortion clinics and practitioners who perform these abortions. WEBA supports these women by giving them a platform of which to speak their “silenced” truths on and in many cases, helps these women attack abortion clinics and practitioners through litigation.

Founder Nancy Jo Mann received an abortion in 1973. In her testimony published in the book Aborted Women, Silent No More in 1987, she tells the story of her decision to have an abortion as one she regrets deeply. In her testimony, Mann goes into detail about the false information that was provided to her by the abortionist and the pain that the procedure brought to her life. The pain that she experienced before, during and after her abortion inspired her to create an outreach to women that have been in her same position, and are grieving with their decision to have an abortion.

References

Anti-abortion organizations in the United States
Abortion in the United States